Vnukovo is a planned Moscow Metro station of the Kalininsko-Solntsevskaya line. It will be located in Vnukovo International Airport and will open in 2023 along with Pykhtino metro station. According to the recent reports, it will be a ground station.

References

Moscow Metro stations
Kalininsko-Solntsevskaya line
Railway stations located underground in Russia
Railway stations under construction in Russia